Bloodfist is a 1989 American martial arts action film directed by Terence H. Winkless, written by Robert King, and starring Don "The Dragon" Wilson. Wilson plays a dojo sensei in California who travels to Manila to avenge his professional kickboxer brother, who was murdered after a fight.  It has become a cult film.

Plot
A man gets beaten by his opponent, but after he finds out the fight was rigged, he decides to fight back. He kills his opponent and is announced as the winner. On his way back to his home, another man kills him.

Back in the United States, retired boxer Jake Raye and co-owner of Hal and Jake's self-defense class receives a call from the Philippines police department. He is told his half-brother Michael is dead, and he must pick up the body in Manila. Raye travels to Manila and collects the body, but he decides to stay there and find his brother's killer. Raye gets training help from a man named Kwong and stays with local kickboxer Baby Davies, upon whom local Filipino neighbor Angela has a crush, and his sister Nancy. Kwong tells Raye about a gladiator-like tournament known as the Red Fist Tournament where only one comes out alive, and his brother's killer will likely be there.

Kwong trains Raye for the tournament and enters him. He manages to win all the fights and proceeds to the final match, where he faces off with Chin Woo. Kwong tells him that Chin Woo is his brother's killer and also the fighter who put Baby Davis in a coma. Hal, who has come from California to watch Raye's final bout, informs Raye that Kwong is the killer after Kwong drugs Raye. Angela comes in with a gun to avenge Baby, but dies at the hands of Chin Woo. Woo is defeated by Raye, who sets off after Michael's true killer. Kwong reveals that his brother was the fighter who died at the hands of Michael that night, and that Kwong is the one who murdered him. Kwong fights Raye in the same alley where Michael died. Raye is badly wounded but impales Kwong on a fence. Nancy and Raye walk off into the night.

Cast
 Don "The Dragon" Wilson as Jake Raye
 Joe Mari Avellana as Kwong
 Rob Kaman as Raton
 Billy Blanks as Black Rose
 Cris Aguilar as Chin Woo (as Kris Aguilar and Chris Aguilar)

Production
The film was made following the success of Bloodsport.

Releases
Bloodfist received a limited release theatrically from Concorde Films, opening on September 22, 1989, and ended up grossing $1,770,082.

The film was released on VHS by MGM/UA Home Entertainment and made over $11 million in video rental sales.

New Concorde Home Entertainment released the film on DVD on May 30, 2000 along with sequels Bloodfist II, Bloodfist III: Forced to Fight, and Bloodfist IV: Die Trying.  The DVD is currently out-of-print.

Reception
Bill Wallace of Black Belt wrote, "[M]aybe it wasn't the best karate film in the world, but at least people could see what different martial artists look like doing their fight scenes."

References

External links
 
 
 

1989 films
1989 martial arts films
Bloodfist films
1980s English-language films
American action films
American martial arts films
Martial arts tournament films
Kickboxing films
Films shot in the Philippines
Films directed by Terence H. Winkless
1980s American films